Kordylewski clouds are large concentrations of dust that exist at the  and  Lagrangian points of the Earth–Moon system. They were first reported by Polish astronomer Kazimierz Kordylewski in the 1960s, and confirmed to exist in October 2018.

Discovery and observation
Kordylewski began looking for a photometrically confirmable concentration of dust at the libration (Lagrangian) points in 1951.

After a change in method suggested by Josef Witkowski, the clouds were first seen by Kordylewski in 1956. Between 6 March and 6 April 1961, he succeeded in photographing two bright patches near the  Lagrange point. The observations were taken from the mountain Kasprowy Wierch.

In 1967, J. Wesley Simpson made observations of the clouds using the Kuiper Airborne Observatory.

In October 2018, the existence of the Kordylewski clouds was reported to have been confirmed, even though, earlier, in 1992, the Japanese Hiten space probe, which passed through the Lagrange points to detect trapped dust particles, did not find an obvious increase in dust levels above the density in surrounding space.
Hiten's failure to find the Kordylewski clouds does not rule out their existence, since the probe revolved around each Lagrange point for only one loop and could have missed the clouds.

Appearance
The Kordylewski clouds are a very faint phenomenon, comparable to the brightness of the gegenschein. They are very difficult to observe from Earth but may be visible to the unaided eye in an exceptionally dark and clear night sky.  Most claimed observations have been made from deserts, at sea, or from mountains. The clouds appear somewhat redder than the gegenschein, indicating that they may be made of a different kind of particle.

They are about 6 degrees in angular diameter. The clouds can drift up to 6 to 10 degrees from those points. Other observations suggest they move around the Lagrange points in ellipses of about 6 by 2 degrees.

See also

Notes

References
 
 
 Hypothetical Planets
 A Search for Objects near the Earth–Moon Lagrangian Points, by Francisco Valdes and Robert A. Freitas Jr., did not find any objects at the Earth–Moon or Earth–Sun lagrange points, but this survey was not sensitive to diffuse clouds.
 
 One of Earth’s shimmering dust clouds has been spotted at last

claimed moons of Earth
science and technology in Poland
trojans (astronomy)